Interstate 670 (I-670) is a  connector highway between I-70 in Kansas City, Kansas, and I-70 in Kansas City, Missouri. The highway provides a more direct route through Downtown Kansas City than the older mainline I-70 and avoids the sharp turn (and reduced speed limit) of the latter at the west end of the Intercity Viaduct. I-670 also makes up the south side of Kansas City's Downtown Loop, where it passes under the southern half of the Kansas City Convention Center.

The road crosses the Kansas River and the West Bottoms, the former location of the Kansas City Stockyards, on the I-670 Viaduct. The leg of the highway west of I-35 is known as the Jay B. Dillingham Freeway. Jay B. Dillingham was a former president of the Stockyards.

Route description

I-670 begins in Kansas City, Kansas, as ramps from I-70/U.S. Route 24 (US 24)/US 40/US 169 meet to form the freeway just before a bridge over the Kansas River, which is located just south of its confluence with the Missouri River. The freeway then crosses the Kansas–Missouri state line and enters Kansas City, Missouri. The road then has an interchange with I-35 just before passing beneath the Kansas City Convention Center. The freeway passes just to the south of the Kansas City Power & Light District and T-Mobile Center in Downtown Kansas City. It meets up with I-70/US 40 again on the southeastern corner of the downtown area; US 71 comprises the north–south portion of the interchange. In Missouri, I-670 is signed as an alternate route to I-70.

History
The freeway was not part of the original planned freeways around Kansas City in 1955. The section east of the I-35 interchange was built first and finished in 1968. The western portion was not planned until 1971 and was not finished until several years later. By 1987, the freeway was extended slightly westward in the Downtown Kansas City area but was not fully extended to I-70 until 1991, when it was fully opened.

On May 20, 1997, sections of I-670 and I-35 in Downtown Kansas City were closed for the filming of a music video for the U2 song "Last Night on Earth". The closure, which was criticized by a local American Automobile Association official, caused some traffic congestion and was the subject of 50–60 complaints to the city government.

Exit list

See also

References

External links

 Kansas Highway Maps: Current, Historic, KDOT
 Interstate 670 Kansas/Missouri, Interstate-Guide.com

6 Kansas
70-6 Kansas-Missouri
70-6
70-6
Transportation in the Kansas City metropolitan area
Transportation in Kansas City, Kansas
Transportation in Wyandotte County, Kansas
Transportation in Jackson County, Missouri